Umreth is one of the 182 Legislative Assembly constituencies of Gujarat state in India. It is part of Anand district.

List of segments

This assembly seat represents the following segments,

 Umreth Taluka
 Anand Taluka (Part) Villages – Ajarpura, Kasor, Rahtalav, Kunjrao, Tarnol, Samarkha, Chikhodra, Rasnol, Khambholaj, Vaghasi, Boriavi (M), Ode (M)

Member of Legislative Assembly

Election results

2022

2017

2012

See also
 List of constituencies of Gujarat Legislative Assembly
 Gujarat Legislative Assembly

References

External links
 

Assembly constituencies of Gujarat
Anand district